Edward Richard O'Malley (March 13, 1863 – May 30, 1935) was an American lawyer and politician who was New York Attorney General and a justice of the New York Supreme Court.

Life

He was born on March 13, 1863, in Medina, Orleans County, New York, the son of Michael O'Malley and Bridget (Whalen) O'Malley.  He worked on the family farm and attended the union school in Medina. Then he taught school and worked in a stone quarry to pay for tuition at Cornell Law School. He graduated as LL.B. in 1891, and was one of the founding members of the Delta Chi fraternity there.

He went to Buffalo, and became a clerk in the firm of Tabor, Sheehan, Cunneen & Coatsworth. In 1892, he was admitted to the bar, and practiced in Buffalo. He also entered politics as a Republican.

O'Malley was a member of the New York State Assembly (Erie Co., 2nd D.) in 1901 and 1902. He was New York Attorney General from 1909 to 1910, elected at the New York state election, 1908 but defeated for re-election at the New York state election, 1910. For the New York state election, 1914, he lost the Republican primary for Attorney General to Egburt E. Woodbury.

In 1914, he was appointed as Referee to inquire into the "Egg Trust" in New York City.

He was a justice of the New York Supreme Court from 1925 to 1933.

He died on May 30, 1935, in Buffalo, New York; and was buried at the Pine Hill Cemetery there.

Sources

1863 births
1935 deaths
New York Supreme Court Justices
Politicians from Buffalo, New York
Members of the New York State Assembly
Cornell University alumni
People from Medina, New York
New York State Attorneys General
Lawyers from Buffalo, New York